The Knights of Pythias Building is an historic three-story redbrick Knights of Pythias building located at 315 Main Street in Fort Worth, Texas. Also known as the Knights of Pythias Castle Hall, it was built in 1901 on the site of an 1881 structure, the first Pythian Castle Hall ever built, which had burned earlier the same year. The building housed the city's first offset printing press and coin-operated laundry.  On , it was added to the National Register of Historic Places. The building is also a Recorded Texas Historic Landmark (RTHL). In 1981, it was restored and is now part of the Sundance Square area of downtown Fort Worth. The lead tenant in the building today is Haltom's Jewelers.

See also

National Register of Historic Places listings in Tarrant County, Texas
Recorded Texas Historic Landmarks in Tarrant County

References

External links

Buildings and structures in Fort Worth, Texas
Clubhouses on the National Register of Historic Places in Texas
Cultural infrastructure completed in 1901
Knights of Pythias buildings
National Register of Historic Places in Fort Worth, Texas
Recorded Texas Historic Landmarks
Sanguinet & Staats buildings